The 2008 Super League Grand Final was the 11th official Grand Final and conclusive and championship-deciding match of the Super League XIII season. Held on Saturday 4 October 2008, at Old Trafford, Manchester, the match was between League Leaders St. Helens and defending champions from 2007 Leeds Rhinos.

Background

Route to the Final

St Helens

Leeds Rhinos

Match details

The coin to see who kicked off was tossed by 12-year-old, James Baxter who won the opportunity through a competition through the leagues sponsor Engage.

2009 World Club Challenge

The Rhinos' win in the grand final earned them the right to play against the 2008 NRL season premiers, the Manly-Warringah Sea Eagles on 1 March 2009 in the World Club Challenge.

References

External links
BBC Match Report
Independent Match Report

St Helens R.F.C. matches
Leeds Rhinos matches
Super League Grand Finals
Grand final